Darren Berrecloth (born October 30, 1981), nicknamed "The Claw", is a professional freeride mountain bike rider. 
Born in Parksville, British Columbia, Canadian Darren Berrecloth is famous not only for his success in competitions, but also as one of the pioneers to the sport of freeride. He exploded onto the freeride scene with a third-placed finish at the 2002 Red Bull Rampage, and has been one of the leading riders in the world ever since.

Career
He went pro when he was 20, in 2001 he even competed in Dirt BMX Gravity Games placing 8th overall.  and would become a pioneer of Slopestyle; in 2005 he placed 2nd in Crankworx Slopestyle in Whistler.

In 2010, he placed third receiving bronze in Red Bull Rampage.

In 2013, X Games Munich had its first Slopestyle Mountain Bike event. Darren would place 5th out of the initial 16 riders in prequalifiers round. In the finals he placed 4th overall. 

He hosted the Bearclaw Invitational on Mt. Washington until putting it on hiatus after the last competition in 2014, a year when he had many injuries. He broke his back in 2011 and had spinal surgery in 2014.  he is part of the Canyon Factory Freeride Team.

References

External links
 Official website

Living people
1981 births
Canadian mountain bikers
Canadian male cyclists
People from Parksville, British Columbia
Place of birth missing (living people)
Sportspeople from British Columbia
Freeride mountain bikers